Yan Ming is the name of:

Yan Ming (empress dowager) (died 152), empress dowager of the Han dynasty
Yen Ming (born 1949), Taiwanese general
Yan Ming (swimmer) (born 1969), Chinese swimmer
Shi Yan Ming, Shaolin warrior monk
Yan Ming (painter), (1917–2005, a Chinese painter and art educator